Alsophila firma, commonly known as the maquique fern, is a deciduous tree fern in the family Cyatheaceae endemic to Mexico, other countries of Central America, Colombia, and Ecuador. In the cloud forests of Mexico, it is considered an emblematic species and serves as a host for native epiphytic plants. However, habitat destruction and overconsumption of the trunks for handicraft production have threatened populations in Mexico. As a result, Alsophila firma is considered threatened in the state of Veracruz and has been given special protection per Mexican law.

Description 
Like other species of Alsophila, Alsophila firma has scaled stems and stipes. Adult individuals grow up to 10.5 meters and are typically found at 750 and 2000 meters above sea level.

Alsophila firma is the host species to a number of fungi including Bisporella pteridicola, Crocicreas quinqueseptatum, Dasyscyphella dryina, Hyaloscypha fuckelii, among others. The stems of Alsophila firma are to date the only known habitat of the fungal genus Arachnopeziza.

Uses 
In Mexican traditional medicine, a filtered infusion of the dried rhizome of Alsophila firma is used to control blood sugar levels among people with type 2 diabetes in a fasting state. Until 2021, this claim of Alsophila firma's hypoglycemic effects were not formally studied. Research by an ethnopharmacology group at the National Autonomous University of Mexico showed both significant glycemic control among hyperglycemic rats who were given an aqueous extract and inhibition of glucose 6-phosphatase and fructose 1,6-bisphosphatase in in vitro assays. Based on these results, the ability to regulate hyperglycemia is believed to be related to inhibiting hepatic glucose output while in a fasting state.

References 

 

firma
Flora of Mexico
Flora of Veracruz
Cloud forest flora of Mexico
Species described in 1869